The position of Dean Ireland's Professor of the Exegesis of Holy Scripture was established at the University of Oxford in 1847. This professorship in the critical interpretation or explanation of biblical texts, a field known as exegesis, was instituted by John Ireland, who was Dean of Westminster from 1816 until his death in 1842.  He founded scholarships in his lifetime at the University of Oxford, which are still awarded after an examination to undergraduates "for the promotion of classical learning and taste". In his will, he left £10,000 to the university, with the interest arising to be applied to the professorship. The first professor, Edward Hawkins, was appointed in 1847. The second Dean Ireland's Professor, Robert Scott, had won an Ireland scholarship in 1833 while studying at Christ Church.

, 13 men have held the position of Dean Ireland's Professor, with differing interests in scriptural exegesis (critical interpretation or explanation of biblical texts). Hawkins was elected on the strength of his reputation gained opposing the Oxford Movement (a group within the Church of England, sometimes called "Tractarians", who aimed to reform the church by reasserting its links with the early Catholic church). In contrast, the third professor, Henry Liddon (elected nine years after Hawkins resigned), was a prominent member of the Oxford Movement.

Between 1932 and 2014, the holder of the chair held a fellowship at The Queen's College. , Markus Bockmuehl is the current professor, having been appointed in 2014; he is a professorial fellow of Keble College.

Professors

See also

Other professorships in Oxford University's Faculty of Theology:
Lady Margaret Professor of Divinity
Oriel Professor of the Interpretation of Holy Scripture
Regius Professor of Divinity
Regius Professor of Ecclesiastical History
Regius Professor of Moral and Pastoral Theology

Notes

References

Exegesis of Holy Scripture, Ireland's, Dean
Exegesis of Holy Scripture, Ireland's, Dean
1847 establishments in England
Lists of people associated with the University of Oxford
The Queen's College, Oxford